The 1979 FIBA Africa Championship for Women was the 6th FIBA Africa Championship for Women, played under the rules of FIBA, the world governing body for basketball, and the FIBA Africa thereof. The tournament was hosted by Somalia from December 31, 1978 to January 2, 1979.

Senegal ended the round-robin tournament with a 2–0 unbeaten record to win their third title  and qualify for the 1979 FIBA Women's World Championship.

Participating teams

Schedule

Final standings

Awards

External links
Official Website

References

1979 FIBA Africa Championship for Women
1979 FIBA Africa Championship for Women
AfroBasket Women
Basketball in Somalia